Ram Talluri (born 26 September) is an Indian film producer in Tollywood. He produces films under his production banner SRT Entertainments. Ram produced his first film Chuttalabbai in 2016. Dandupalya 3, a Kannada-language crime thriller was produced by Ram Talluri which was released in March 2018.

Early life
Ram started making short films and later successfully ventured into full-length feature films. Chuttalabbai, a romantic comedy entertainer starring Aadi in the lead role, was his first Telugu movie as a producer. After hitting success at the Box office, Ram produced for his second film Nela Ticket starring Ravi Teja and Jagapathi Babu. His next film with Ravi Teja and Payal Rajput titled Disco Raja. Ram is the director of Lead IT Corporation, Ram Innovations and Ram Entertainments (Sky zone)

Filmography

As producer 

Also he produced a Bengali film Tiger, which was a remake of Tamil film Ramana, Released on 2007.

Other
There are some speculations about his entry into politics, becoming a member of Pawan Kalyan's Jana Sena Party.

References

External links
 

Living people
Telugu film producers
Telugu politicians
Year of birth missing (living people)
Jana Sena Party politicians
Film producers from Andhra Pradesh
Indian film producers